Bostondeh (formerly Urtaqishloq) is a village in Sughd Region, northern Tajikistan. It is part of the jamoat Sarazm in the city of Panjakent. It is located on the RB12 highway.

References

Populated places in Sughd Region